Little Walnut Village is an unincorporated community and census-designated place (CDP) in Grant County, New Mexico, United States. It was first listed as a CDP prior to the 2020 census.

The community is east of the center of Grant County and is bordered to the south by Silver City, the county seat. The CDP is bordered to the north and west by Gila National Forest.

Demographics

References 

Census-designated places in Grant County, New Mexico
Census-designated places in New Mexico